Eaglescliffe is a railway station on the Tees Valley Line, which runs between  and  via . It is owned by Network Rail and managed by Northern Trains.

History

Before the station
The previous line ran on the east side of Yarm Road, through the grounds of Preston Hall. It is said that Lord Preston (Marshall Robinson Fowler) was unhappy the disruption that trains, such as Locomotion No. 1, caused to his cattle and had insisted that it was moved west of the road. When the Stockton and Darlington Railway re-aligned their line.

The railway station serving the parishes of Preston-on-Tees and Egglescliffe, was known as Preston. Displeased at the cost of moving the station, the railway owners decided to name the new station after Egglescliffe (ultimately using a different spelling) instead.

Opening
The station was opened by the Leeds Northern Railway on 25 May 1852, with their line from Melmerby to Stockton. That line deviates from the original alignment of the Stockton and Darlington Railway. The station became known as Eaglescliffe Junction, as passengers could change between services on the two respective lines. Originally the station had four platforms: the westernmost platforms were taken out of use in the late 1960s and since been removed.

Misspelling
There are various stories as to how the station got the name Eaglescliffe, instead of the intended, Egglescliffe. One such set of stories is that the signwriter was sent a telegram with a misspelling to paint the sign as Eaglescliffe. Another variant was that the signwriter thought to change it, after believing it to be incorrect. In each variation, it is said that the sign was not changed for a period of time, by which time the name had been adopted. In the following years the surrounding area came to be known interchangeably as Eaglescliffe (on road signs) or Egglescliffe (often referring to the original village or in building names).

Facilities
The station's facilities have been recently upgraded during the early and mid–2010s, with improvements including the installation of real-time information screens and CCTV, as well as renewed station signage.

In January 2012, construction work started on a new ticket office at the station. In April 2015, the station's previous waiting shelters were replaced by a modern waiting room.

The station has been staffed since 2012. Initially, the ticket office was operated by an independent company, Chester-le-Track, which also operated the station at Chester-le-Street. Chester-le-Track ceased trading on 31 March 2018, and the booking office was subsequently closed.

The ticket office was later re-opened on 3 April 2018, and is now managed by Northern Trains, with staff provided by Grand Central. As of July 2021, the ticket office is open between 09:00 and 16:00 on weekdays, and closed on Saturday and Sunday.

There is step-free access to the island platform via the ramped footbridge from the car park and station entrance.

Services

Grand Central
As of the June 2021 timetable change, there are four trains per day heading south towards London King's Cross via York. Heading north towards Sunderland, there are five trains per day on weekdays, with four and three trains per day on Saturday and Sunday respectively.

Rolling stock used: Class 180 Adelante

Northern Trains
As of the May 2021 timetable change, the station is served by two trains per hour between Saltburn and Darlington via Middlesbrough, with one train per hour extending to Bishop Auckland. An hourly service operates between Saltburn and Bishop Auckland on Sunday.

Rolling stock used: Class 156 Super Sprinter and Class 158 Express Sprinter

References

Sources

Body, G. (1988), PSL Field Guides - Railways of the Eastern Region Volume 2, Patrick Stephens Ltd, Wellingborough,

External links
 
 

Railway stations in the Borough of Stockton-on-Tees
DfT Category F1 stations
Former North Eastern Railway (UK) stations
Railway stations in Great Britain opened in 1853
Railway stations served by Grand Central Railway
Northern franchise railway stations